Alexeevca is a commune in Ungheni District, Moldova. It is composed of three villages: Alexeevca, Lidovca and Săghieni.

References

Communes of Ungheni District